Antony J. L. Bedard is an American writer and editor who has worked in the comic book industry from the early 1990s through the present. He is best known for his work at CrossGen Comics, where he was under exclusive contract, and for his run writing Marvel Comics X-Men spin-off Exiles.

Background

Back in Tony's college days at the Alpha Gamma Chapter of the Delta Sigma Phi Fraternity he would write comic book characters for all of the brothers. His personal character was Tonan the Barbarian, who he posed as in his 1989 composite photo while the President of the Fraternity.

Career
Tony began his work in the comics industry by working at Valiant Comics as an intern. There he worked his way up, first by lettering some of Valiant's comics and eventually becoming the editor and writer of several titles including Rai, Psi-Lords and Magnus Robot Fighter. His early work is often credited by his full name - Anthony Bedard. After Valiant, Tony moved to freelance work for Broadway, Malibu and Crusade Comics, where he wrote the first two issues of Shi: The Series.

Tony then moved to an editorial position at DC Comics. Here he worked on a number of projects, the most notable being the Hourman monthly. He eventually moved into the Vertigo imprint where he edited several monthly titles, including Vertigo's longest running title Hellblazer.

In 2001 Bedard signed an exclusive contract with CrossGen Comics. Bedard provided editorial knowledge to the company and took over writing CrossGen's launch title Mystic. He went on to co-create Negation with Mark Waid and wrote a number of series for Crossgen. Bedard was writing the mini-series Negation War (which featured characters from the Negation series and was meant to wrap up important plot threads in Negation and the other CrossGen titles) when CrossGen filed for bankruptcy. As a result, only two issues of the series were ever published, and Bedard became the last writer of the Sigilverse.

After CrossGen, Bedard began work on the Marvel Comics series Exiles, which he wrote for 44 issues and an annual. Originally announced as leaving Exiles with #83, his run was extended by six issues due to Chris Claremont being diagnosed with cardiac stress. Bedard also scripted Uncanny X-Men #472-473 and Annual #1, with plots from Claremont, and was the sole writer of Uncanny X-Men #474. Apart from Exiles he had a number of side projects, including the mini-series  Spider-Man: Breakout and the final 6 issues of the Rogue monthly comic book.

Bedard then started writing for other comic publishers. With Image Comics, Bedard put out a mini-series he created called Retro Rocket and co-wrote three issues of DC Comics' Supergirl and the Legion of Superheroes, helping out his former CrossGen co-worker Mark Waid.

After wrapping up his run on Exiles, Tony returned to DC Comics and worked on a story in JSA: Classified. At the Wondercon Convention, Bedard announced that he had signed on to a two-year exclusive contract with DC Comics. His first announced projects included writing portions of the new weekly series Countdown, a six issue arc on Supergirl and the Legion of Super-Heroes and a four issue Black Canary mini-series.

Bedard then went on to write fill-in arcs on both Supergirl and Birds of Prey  as well as contributing to The Outsiders fifth week event in August. He was originally announced as the ongoing writer of the 2007 relaunch of Batman and The Outsiders, however he was replaced by Chuck Dixon due to his commitments to other DC series, including writing a months worth of Countdown scripts. He was the regular writer for Birds of Prey from #118 until the series end with #127.

In 2009 Bedard moved on to a number of projects at DC, the first of those being an all-new monthly series called R.E.B.E.L.S. which began in February, with artist Andy Clarke.

In 2010 Bedard became the ongoing writer for Green Lantern Corps starting with issue 48, coinciding with the beginning of the "Brightest Day" crossover event and in 2011 he launched the bi-weekly DC Universe Online Legends series co-written with Marv Wolfman.

As part of DC's 2011 New 52 initiative, Bedard became the ongoing writer for Green Lantern: New Guardians and Blue Beetle. Blue Beetle lasted for 16 issues and a Zero Issue and was cancelled in January 2013. Bedard left New Guardians when all of the Green Lantern books changed creative teams with the departure of Geoff Johns from the main title in May 2013. When DC relaunched the Sword of Sorcery fantasy anthology title in 2012, Bedard wrote the first backup story, featuring Beowulf. In December 2013 Bedard returned to Supergirl as the ongoing writer from issue 26.

Writing bibliography

Valiant
Valiant Reader (1993) #1
Magnus Robot Fighter #32, #35-46, #49-54 (1994–95).
Rai and the Future Force #18, #20-23 (1994).
Rai #24-30, #33 (1994–95).
Psi Lords #1-10 (1994–95)
Shadowman #25 (1994).Turok: Dinosaur Hunter #17-19 (1994–95)Solar, Man of the Atom #55-59 (1996).

BroadwayPowers That Be #6 (1996).Starseed #7 (1996).

CrusadeShi: The Series #1-2, #7-8 (1997–98).Tomoe: Unforgettable Fire #1 (1997).

DC\Vertigo
Flinch #10 (3rd Story) (1999).

CrossGen
Mystic #18-43 (2001–2003).
Negation Prequel One-Shot (2001). Co-Writer with Mark Waid
Negation #1-27 (2001–2004). Note: #1 & #2 Co-Written by Mark Waid
CrossGen Chronicles #7 (2002).
Route 666 #1-22 (2002–2004).
Negation: Lawbringer #1 (2002).
Mark of Charon #1-5 (2003).
Kiss Kiss Bang Bang #1-5 (2004).
Negation: War #1-2 (2004).

Marvel
Exiles #46-89, Annual #1 (2004–2006).
X-Men Unlimited Vol. 2 #6 (1st Story) (2005).
Rogue vol.3, #7-12 (2005).
X-Men: Age of Apocalypse One-Shot (2nd Story) (2005).
Spider-Man: Breakout #1-5 (2005).
What If...? Featuring Captain America #1 (2005).
Untold Tales of the New Universe: Psi-Force #1 (2006).
Uncanny X-Men #472-473 (scripts only), #474, Annual #1 (2006).
Marvel Adventures: The Avengers #5 - #8 (2006).

DC
DCU: Brave New World #1 ("Look to the Skies" framing sequence only) (2006).
Supergirl and the Legion of Superheroes #20-22 (2006). Co-writer with Mark Waid
Birds of Prey #100 (Black Canary story only), #109 - 112, #118-127 (2006, 2007, 2008–2009).
DC: Infinite Holiday Special (Trials of Shazam Story Only, Gift of the Magi) (2006).
JSA Classified #17-18, #25 (2006, 2007).
Countdown #49, #45, #40, #36, #32, #28, #22, #19, #17-13 (2007–2008).
Supergirl and the Legion of Superheroes #29, #31 - 36 (2007).
Black Canary #1 - #4 (2007).
Supergirl #20 - #22 (2007).
Outsiders: Five of A Kind - Week 3: Thunder/Martian Manhunter (2007).
Outsiders #50 (2007).
DC Infinite Halloween Special - (Aquaman Story Only, Children of the Deep) (2007).
Batman Confidential #13 - 16 (2008).
R.E.B.E.L.S #1-28 (2009–2011).
R.E.B.E.L.S Annual: Starro the Conqueror #1 (2009).
The Great Ten #1-9 (2009–2010).
Catwoman #83 (2010).
Adventure Comics #7 (2010).
Gotham City Sirens #12-15 (2010).
Green Lantern Corps #48-63 (2010–2011).
DC Universe Online Legends #1-present (2011–present). Co-writer with Marv Wolfman
Flashpoint: Emperor Aquaman #1-3 (2011).
Green Lantern: New Guardians #1-20, #0 (2011-2013).
Blue Beetle #1-16, #0 (2011-2013).
Sword of Sorcery (Beowulf story) #1-3, #0 (2012-2013)
The Ravagers #10-12 (2013). Co-writer with Michael Nelson
DC Universe Presents #19 (2013).
Supergirl vol. 6 #26-35 (2013-2014).
Supergirl: Futures End #1 (2014).
Convergence: Aquaman #1-2 (2015).
Convergence: Green Lantern/Parallax #1-2 (2015).
Convergence: Speed Force #1-2 (2015).
Teen Titans vol. 5 #20-24 (2016).

Image
Retro Rocket #1-4 (2006–2007).

Editing bibliography

Valiant
Darque Passages #1 (1994)
Harbinger #27-34 (1994)
Ninjak #3-8 (1994)
Turok, Dinosaur Hunter #11-16 (1994)

Crusade
Angel Fire #1 (1997)

DC
DC One Million #1-4 (1998)
JLA #24 - 26, #28 - 42, #1,000,000 (1998–2000)
Hourman #1-25 (1999–2001)
Fanboy #1-6 (1999)
All Star Comics 80 Page Giant #1 (1999)
Day of Judgement Secret Files and Origins #1 (1999)
Aquaman Vol. 5 #61 - #75 (1999–2001)
Batman: No Man's Land Secret Files and Origins #1 (1999)
Batman: Gotham City Secret Files and Origins #1 (2000)
Wonder Woman #164 - 165 (2000)
The Spectre #1 (2001)

DC\Vertigo
Codename: Knockout #1-5 (2001)
Hellblazer #158-165 (2001)
Transmetropolitan #43-48 (2001)
Adventures in the Rifle Brigade: Operation Bollock #1-2 (2001)

References

External links 
Tony Bedard message board at Comic Book Resources
Negation Space A Negation fan site that contains information on the series as well as two interviews with Tony Bedard

Interviews

Comic World News An interview with Tony Bedard
Pop Syndicate An interview with Tony Bedard
PLuGHiTz Live! An interview with Tony Bedard

American comics writers
Living people
Year of birth missing (living people)